Kodurupadu is a village in Eluru district in the state of Andhra Pradesh in India.

Demographics

 India census, Kodurupadu has a population of 1227 of which 633 are males while 594 are females. Average Sex Ratio is 938. Child population is 114 which makes up 9.29% of total population of village with sex ratio 810. In 2011, literacy rate of the village was 73:58% when compared to 67.02% of Andhra Pradesh.

References 

Villages in Eluru district